John Simmons (16 July 1912 – 25 June 2005) was a British sprint canoer who competed in the late 1940s. At the 1948 Summer Olympics in London, he was eliminated in the heats of the K-2 1000 m event.

References
Sports-reference.com profile

1912 births
2005 deaths
Canoeists at the 1948 Summer Olympics
Olympic canoeists of Great Britain
British male canoeists